This is a list of monarchs of the Netherlands (Dutch: Koningen der Nederlanden). By practical extension, the list includes the stadtholders of the House of Orange Nassau since 1556. However, they were voted into office by, and were civil servants and generals of, the semi-independent provinces of the Dutch Republic and cannot be seen as monarchs. From William IV they were the direct male line ancestors of later monarchs when the monarchy was established in 1813 (first as a Sovereign Principality, but in 1815 as a Kingdom).

Dutch Republic (1581–1795)

The origin of the Dutch monarchy can be traced back to the appointment of William I, Prince of Orange as stadtholder of Holland, Zeeland and Utrecht in 1559 by Philip II of Spain. However, he was removed from office and became the leader of the Dutch Revolt. Consequently, the States-General appointed him as stadtholder of both rebelling provinces, Holland and Zeeland, in 1572. During the Dutch Revolt, most of the Dutch provinces declared their independence with the Act of Abjuration, signed on 26 July 1581 in The Hague in conformation with the decision made by the States-General. The representative function of the stadtholder became obsolete in the rebellious northern Netherlands – the feudal Lord himself having been abolished – but the office nevertheless continued in these provinces who now united themselves into the Republic of the Seven United Netherlands. All stadtholders after William I were drawn from his descendants or the descendants of his brother, who were also the descendants of his granddaughter Albertina Agnes of Nassau-Orange.

In 1795 the Republic was overthrown by the French Republic and replaced with the Batavian Republic. In 1806 Napoleon abolished the new republic and made his brother King of Holland. However, in 1810 Napoleon invaded the Netherlands and annexed them to France. In 1813, Allied forces drove out the French. The Dutch called back William Frederick, the son of the last stadtholder, to head the new government.  He was proclaimed "sovereign prince". In 1815, he raised the Netherlands to the status of a kingdom and proclaimed himself King William I. The kingdom was enlarged with the Southern Netherlands, now Belgium and Luxembourg, soon after.

Stadtholderate under the House of Orange-Nassau

When William III died childless, the patrilineal ancestry of Orange-Nassau became extinct. In contrast to other provinces of the Dutch Republic, Friesland, Groningen and Drenthe had mostly drawn its stadtholders from the House of Nassau, that starting with John VI, the brother of William of Orange, and comprises in addition a matrilineal ancestry with the house of Orange-Nassau.

Stadtholderate under the House of Nassau

Kingdom of Holland (1806–1810)

Sovereign Principality of the United Netherlands (1813–1815)

Kingdom of the Netherlands (1815–present)

See also
Style of the Dutch sovereign
Regalia of the Netherlands
Royal Standard of the Netherlands
Line of succession to the Dutch throne
List of heirs to the Dutch throne
List of rulers of the Netherlands
Inauguration of the Dutch monarch
List of Dutch royal consorts

References

Netherlands
Monarchs of the Netherlands
 List
Monarchs